The 1609 Venice Haggadah contains the text of the Passover Haggadah which accompanies the Passover Seder. The haggadah was created by Israel ha-Zifroni of Guastalla. The Haggadah appeared with translations into Judeo-Italian, Judaeo-Spanish (Ladino), and Judeo-German (Yiddish).

The New Venice Haggadah of 1609 was republished to mark the 500th anniversary of the imposition of the Venetian Ghetto. The new haggadah was published by Damocle Edizioni and printed in Venice.

References

External links

Ashkenazi Jewish culture in Italy
Haggadah of Pesach
Jews and Judaism in Venice
Judaeo-Italian languages
Judaeo-Spanish literature
Sephardi Jewish culture in Italy
Yiddish culture in Europe
Yiddish-language literature